Basketball in Canada dates back to the 20th century. Basketball is played year-round by men and women and various levels of competition. Several professional basketball leagues have teams based in Canada.

History
James Naismith, a Canadian who moved to the United States, invented basketball in Springfield, Massachusetts in the 1890s. This new sport soon  became popular as an indoor sport that needed a minimal equipment, gaining popularity at high schools and colleges in Canada.

The Toronto Huskies were co-founders of the Basketball Association of America, a forerunner of the NBA, but disbanded after the first season.

In Canada, the sport has long lived in the shadow of ice hockey, but in the early 21st century the sport saw a rise in popularity, partly due to the Toronto Raptors, an expansion National Basketball Association (NBA) franchise established in 1995. The Vancouver Grizzlies was another NBA expansion franchise that was based in Vancouver, British Columbia from 1995 to 2001, when it was relocated to Memphis, Tennessee.

The National Basketball League was played for one and a half seasons in 1993 and 1994.

In 2011, a new domestic league was formed, the National Basketball League of Canada (NBL Canada), with the London Lightning won its first two national titles. NBL Canada presently operate 10 franchises throughout Canada. The league was the first fully domestic professional basketball league to operate in Canada since the National Basketball League, which operated from 1993 to 1994.

The Canadian Elite Basketball League (CEBL) is a professional tier 1 basketball league which began play in 2019 season.

The Toronto Raptors won their first NBA championship in 2019, the first champion outside of the United States.

Collegiate basketball
Students in Canada may participate in varsity basketball teams in colleges and universities throughout Canada. U Sports is the national sports governing body for university sports in Canada, whereas the Canadian Colleges Athletic Association is the national governing body for colleges. The winners of U Sports' annual men's basketball championship are awarded the W. P. McGee Trophy, whereas the winners of the women's annual basketball championship are awarded the Bronze Baby trophy. Growing numbers of Canadian men and women play college basketball in the United States' National Collegiate Athletic Association.

Professional basketball

Presently, only one team in the NBA is based in Canada, the Toronto Raptors. The Raptors also operate a minor league professional team, the Raptors 905 of the NBA G League. Both Raptors franchises are based in the Greater Toronto Area. In addition to the NBA, there are three other professional basketball leagues which have a team based in Canada, the National Basketball League of Canada, Canadian Elite Basketball League, and the American Basketball Association.

However, a number of Canadians play in the NBA including Chris Boucher, Andrew Wiggins, Brandon Clarke, Chris Duarte, Cory Joseph, Dalano Banton, Dillon Brooks, Dwight Powell, Ignas Brazdeikis, Jamal Murray, Joshua Primo, Kelly Olynyk, Khem Birch, Lindell Wigginton, Luguentz Dort, Oshae Brissett, Nickeil Alexander-Walker, Nik Stauskas, RJ Barrett, Shai Gilgeous-Alexander, Trey Lyles, and Tristan Thompson. In addition, four Canadians are playing in the Women's National Basketball Association including Adut Bulgak, Kayla Alexander, Kia Nurse, and Natalie Achonwa. Canadian collegiate athletes playing basketball may choose to play professionally overseas after university or college. In addition, there are several Canadians playing professionally for various professional basketball organizations throughout North America. The most prominent player is Steve Nash, 2-time NBA Most Valuable Player and 2-time FIBA AmeriCup Most Valuable Player.

Notable Canadians in the Women's National Basketball Association include Tammy Sutton-Brown, Kayla Alexander, Stacey Dales, Natalie Achonwa and Adut Bulgak.

National competition
Canada has competed in a number of international competitions contested by national teams, most notably the Summer Olympics, and tournaments organized by FIBA, including the Basketball World Cup, and the Women's Basketball World Cup.

The Canadian men's national basketball team has made nine appearances at the Summer Olympic basketball tournament, winning silver at the 1936 Summer Olympics. The men's national team has also made 13 appearances to the FIBA World Cup. The Canadian women's national basketball team have made six appearances to the Summer Olympics, and 10 to the Women's World Cup. The women's national team won bronze in the 1979 and 1986 Women's World Cup tournaments.

In addition to the national team, Canada Basketball also manages a number of youth teams, including the women's under-17, men's under-17, women's under-19, and the men's under-19 teams.

See also
 Naismith Cup
 List of basketball teams in Canada

References